Shiokawa Dam is a gravity dam located in Yamanashi Prefecture in Japan. The dam is used for flood control, irrigation and water supply. The catchment area of the dam is 85.3 km2. The dam impounds about 48  ha of land when full and can store 11500 thousand cubic meters of water. The construction of the dam was started on 1975 and completed in 1997.

References

Dams in Yamanashi Prefecture
1997 establishments in Japan